The Athens Republique was an African American newspaper in Athens, Georgia, USA, that was published from 1919 to 1927.  The paper's editor, Lt. Julian Lucasse Brown, was a World War I veteran who founded the paper upon his return from serving in France.  The paper reported on racial progress and setbacks, and denounced lynchings and the rise of the Ku Klux Klan.  The newspaper's motto was, "Devoted to the Religious, the Educational and the Industrial Development of the Colored Race" and it was closely associated with the Jeruel Baptist Association.  After the demise of The Athens Republique, there was no African American newspaper in Athens until the founding of the Athens Voice in 1975.

References

External links 

Defunct newspapers published in Georgia (U.S. state)
Companies based in Athens, Georgia
Newspapers established in 1919
Publications disestablished in 1927
Defunct African-American newspapers
Defunct weekly newspapers
1919 establishments in Georgia (U.S. state)
1927 disestablishments in Georgia (U.S. state)
African-American history of Georgia (U.S. state)